Marcus Mølvadgaard (born 3 August 1999) is a Danish professional footballer who plays as a forward for Næstved.

Club career

Randers FC
In May 2015, Mølvadgaard went on a trial at German club 1. FSV Mainz 05 for one week, though without earning any contract.

Mølvadgaard got his debut for Randers FC on 5 August 2016. He started on the bench, but replaced Viktor Lundberg in the 82nd minute in a 1–0 victory against AC Horsens in the Danish Superliga.

On 15 November 2016 it was confirmed, that Mølvadgaard had signed a new 2-year full-professional contract with RFC, and was permanently moved up to the first team squad, starting from new year 2017.

On 31 January 2019, Mølvadgaard was loaned out to Danish 1st Division club Hvidovre IF for the rest of the season.

In July 2019, the sporting director of Randers announced to the medias, that Mølvadgaard wouldn't play for the club anymore and had to find a new club because his contract would expire within six months.

Strømsgodset
After a week on trial, Mølvadgaard signed a contract until the end of 2022 with Strømsgodset on 4 February 2020. However, he left the club at the end of 2020. 

In an interview in April 2021, Mølvadgaard revealed that he had lost the desire to play football under the management of Strømsgodset manager Henrik Pedersen and would take a break from football. Mølvadgaard stated in the interview, among other things the following: "I think it's so fantastic that Henrik Pedersen is no longer the coach of Strømsgodset. Because it's a man who's ruined a whole year of my life as a football player".

Košice
On 9 July 2021, Mølvadgaard joined Slovak club FC Košice on a three-year deal. However, after the club failed to win promotion to Fortuna Liga, it was announced that Mølvadgaard would depart at the end of the season.

Penafiel
On 1 August 2022 it was confirmed, that Mølvadgaard had joined Liga Portugal 2 club Penafiel, signing a three-year deal. On 31 January 2023 the club confirmed, that Mølvadgaard's contract had been terminated by mutual consent.

Næstved
Later on the same day as Mølvadgaard left Penafiel, he signed with Danish 1st Division club Næstved.

References

External links
 
 Marcus Mølvadgaard at DBU

1999 births
Living people
Danish men's footballers
Danish expatriate men's footballers
Denmark youth international footballers
Association football forwards
Randers FC players
Hvidovre IF players
Strømsgodset Toppfotball players
FC Košice (2018) players
F.C. Penafiel players
Næstved Boldklub players
Danish Superliga players
Danish 1st Division players
Eliteserien players
2. Liga (Slovakia) players
Liga Portugal 2 players
Danish expatriate sportspeople in Norway
Danish expatriate sportspeople in Slovakia
Danish expatriate sportspeople in Portugal
Expatriate footballers in Norway
Expatriate footballers in Slovakia
Expatriate footballers in Portugal
People from Randers Municipality
Sportspeople from the Central Denmark Region